Plan-de-Cuques is a commune northeast of Marseille in the department of Bouches-du-Rhône in the Provence-Alpes-Côte d'Azur region of France. It is located 9.2 km (5.7 mi) from Marseille.

Population

The inhabitants are called Plan-de-Cuquois in French.

See also
Communes of the Bouches-du-Rhône department

References

Communes of Bouches-du-Rhône
Bouches-du-Rhône communes articles needing translation from French Wikipedia